Pablo Eduardo Sisniega Fink (born 7 July 1995) is a Mexican professional footballer who plays as goalkeeper for Major League Soccer club Charlotte FC.

Career
After spending time with Real Sociedad, Sisniega joined Major League Soccer side Los Angeles FC on 18 February 2019.

Sisniega made his professional debut on 11 June 2019, starting in a 3–0 win over Real Salt Lake in a Lamar Hunt US Open Cup fixture. On 20 June 2019, with Tyler Miller away at the 2019 Gold Cup, Sisniega made eight saves to help Los Angeles win 3–1 over San Jose Earthquakes in the Round of 16 of the US Open Cup. On 3 July 2019, in his second MLS appearance, Sisniega made several key saves to help his team in a 5–1 away win at Sporting Kansas City, including an 82nd minute penalty save on Daniel Salloi.

On 12 December 2021, Sisniega was traded to Charlotte FC in exchange for $50,000 of General Allocation Money ahead of their inaugural MLS season in 2022.

Career statistics

Club

Honours
Los Angeles FC
Supporters' Shield: 2019

References

External links 
 

1995 births
Living people
Mexican footballers
Mexican people of German descent
Association football goalkeepers
Real Sociedad footballers
Los Angeles FC players
Charlotte FC players
Major League Soccer players
Mexican expatriate footballers
Expatriate soccer players in the United States
Real Sociedad B footballers
Mexican expatriate sportspeople in the United States
Mexican expatriate sportspeople in Spain
Expatriate footballers in Spain